Hady Ismail Ghandour (born 27 January 2000) is a professional footballer who plays as a forward.

Coming through the youth system, Ghandour began his senior career at Tooting & Mitcham United in 2018. He moved to Charlton Athletic after two seasons at the club, and was sent on loans to Maidstone United and Chelmsford City. In 2022, Ghandour joined Maidstone United permanently.

Born in England, Ghandour is of Lebanese descent. He has represented Lebanon internationally at both youth and senior level, and made his senior debut in the qualifiers for the 2022 FIFA World Cup.

Early life 
Born in Westminster, London, England on 27 January 2000, and raised in Chelsea, London, Ghandour holds both English and Lebanese citizenship. His father, Ismail, had moved to the United Kingdom from Tripoli, Lebanon at age 13, to study at the Royal Russel School in Croydon, South London. His mother is also from Tripoli. 

While living in England, Ghandour used to play for AC Tripoli's youth team in Lebanon during the Easter and summer vacations. Towards the end of his A-Levels, Ghandour trialed for Charlton Athletic; however, he decided to concentrate on his studies. He joined Tooting & Mitcham United in 2016, playing for the U18 and U23 teams.

Club career

Tooting & Mitcham United

2018–19: Debut season 
Coming through the youth system, Ghandour made his senior debut for Isthmian League South Central Division side Tooting & Mitcham United on 9 October 2018, against Burgess Hill Town in the Velocity Trophy. His first league game came four days later against Cheshunt. One week later, on 20 October, Ghandour scored his first goal, helping his side beat Egham Town 4–3 away from home in the league. On 23 February 2019, he scored his first brace for Tooting & Mitcham United, against Waltham Abbey in a 2–1 win. Ghandour ended the 2018–19 season with seven goals in 25 league appearances.

2019–20: Four goals in one game 
Ghandour's first goal of the 2019–20 season came on 20 August 2019, in a 3–1 home win against Ashford Town. On 7 December 2019, he scored four goals against Chertsey Town, helping his side win 5–0. The player stated in an interview: "It’s just surreal. To score four goals – at any level – is crazy. It doesn’t come around often at all." Ghandour scored six goals in 17 league appearances – seven in 31 in all competitions. For his performances, Ghandour was nominated 2019–20 Tooting & Mitcham United Managers' Player of the Season, and Supporters' Most Improved Player of the Season.

Charlton Athletic

2020–21: Professional debut 
In January 2020, Ghandour went on an eight-week trial to Championship side Charlton Athletic, for whom he had already trialed a few years prior. On 14 August 2020, Ghandour signed for the Charlton Athletic Under-23s on a one-year contract, with an option to extend for a further year. On 15 October 2020, he made his debut in the Professional Development League against QPR, becoming the first Lebanese to do so. He played as a winger, helping create Charlton's second goal in a 3–0 win.

Ghandour made his senior professional debut on 10 November 2020, playing as a starter against Leyton Orient in the EFL Trophy. The match ended in a 3–1 win, with Ghandour providing a key pass to help set-up the 1–0 lead. Ghandour scored his first goal for the Under-23s against Bristol City on 30 November 2020, scoring a chip goal following an individual run where he beat three defenders. On 11 January 2021, Ghandour scored a brace for the Under-23s in a 4–0 home win against Cardiff City. Charlton Athletic exercised the option of an extra year on 18 May.

2021–22 season: Loans to Maidstone United and Chelmsford City 
Ghandour scored his first goal for Charlton on 24 July 2021, equalising in a 1–1 pre-season friendly draw against Reading. Ghandour made his EFL Cup debut on 10 August, as a starter in a 1–0 defeat against AFC Wimbledon.

On 21 October 2021, Ghandour joined Maidstone United in the National League South on a one-month loan. He made his debut on 23 October, as a starter in a 2–0 defeat to Dorking Wanderers. Ghandour finished his loan spell with five games.

Ghandour was once again loaned out to the National League South, joining Chelmsford City on 7 January 2022. He played his first game on 11 January, starting against Bowers & Pitsea in the Essex Senior Cup; City lost on penalty shoot-outs following a 0–0 draw after regular time. Ghandour's first league game came four days later, in a 0–0 home draw against Welling United. On 17 January, he provided an assist in a 1–1 draw against St Albans City. He played five games in the league and cup.

On 11 March 2022, Ghandour returned to Maidstone United on loan for the rest of the 2021–22 season. He made his second debut on 15 March, as an 86th-minute substitute in a 2–0 win against Dulwich Hamlet. Ghandour scored against Chelmsford City on 30 April, to help his side win 3–1; with the three points, Maidstone were mathematically crowned National League South champions. He finished the season with two goals in 10 games for the club.

On 23 May 2022, it was announced that Ghandour was leaving Charlton Athletic at the end of his contract.

Maidstone United 
On 21 June 2022, Ghandour signed on a permanent basis with his former loan club Maidstone United ahead of the 2022–23 National League. Ghandour was sidelined throughout September due to an adductor muscle injury. He underwent an operation for a double hernia repair in October, and was due to recover within two to four weeks. On 15 February 2023, the club announced the departure of Ghandour by mutual consent.

International career

Youth 
Born in England, Ghandour is eligible to represent Lebanon internationally through his parents. In 2015 he made his debut for the Lebanon U16 team, scoring in a friendly game against Syria which Lebanon won 3–2. Ghandour participated in the 2016 AFC U-16 Championship qualifications, playing in all three group stage games. Lebanon failed to qualify to the final tournament, finishing last in their group.

In 2017 Ghandour represented Lebanon U19 at the 2018 AFC Championship qualification, playing against Iraq and Qatar. Regarding his match against the latter, Ghandour stated: "When I played in Qatar it was on TV, so my mum could watch from London. Singing the anthem was an incredible feeling – very emotional. It’s 100 per cent the best thing I’ve ever done". As Lebanon lost both games, they failed to qualify for the final tournament, finishing last in their group.

Ghandour was due to join the Lebanon U23 camp in Iraq in January 2021; however, due to COVID-19 restrictions, he wasn't able to join the national team.

Senior 
Ghandour was called up to the senior team ahead of the 2022 FIFA World Cup qualification matches against the United Arab Emirates and South Korea in September 2021. He made his debut on 7 September, coming on as an 85th-minute substitute in a 1–0 defeat to South Korea.

Style of play 
Ghandour is a dynamic striker who has also played as a winger on occasion, and can also play as an attacking midfielder. His main characteristics are his work rate and tactical understanding; he "creates space for his team mates", and has been praised for "his hard work" and "dedication to get stronger and fitter".

Upon Ghandour's loan move to Chelmsford, manager Robbie Simpson labelled him as a player who can "score goals" and is a "great runner", who "can play in any of our top three positions".

Personal life 
Ghandour is a supporter of English club Leeds United, and his favourite player is Robert Lewandowski, also citing Cristiano Ronaldo as a source of inspiration. Ghandour studied at Cass Business School, and at City, University of London.

Career statistics

Club

International

Honours 
Maidstone United
 National League South: 2021–22

Individual
 Tooting & Mitcham United Managers' Player of the Season: 2019–20
 Tooting & Mitcham United Supporters' Most Improved Player of the Season: 2019–20

See also 
 List of Lebanon international footballers born outside Lebanon

References

External links

 Profile at Charlton Athletic
 Profile at Maidstone United
 

2000 births
Living people
English people of Lebanese descent
Sportspeople of Lebanese descent
Lebanese footballers
English footballers
Footballers from Westminster
Footballers from Chelsea, London
Association football forwards
AC Tripoli players
Tooting & Mitcham United F.C. players
Charlton Athletic F.C. players
Maidstone United F.C. players
Chelmsford City F.C. players
Isthmian League players
National League (English football) players
Lebanon youth international footballers
Lebanon international footballers
Alumni of Bayes Business School
Alumni of City, University of London